Timothy James Abromaitis (born September 17, 1989) is an American professional basketball player for Lenovo Tenerife of the Liga ACB. He played college basketball at Notre Dame.

Early life
Abromaitis was born in Waterbury, Connecticut and grew up in Unionville, Connectict. He graduated from Farmington High School.

College career
Abromaitis, a 6'8" forward, chose to play college basketball at Notre Dame and enrolled in 2007. He played sparingly as a freshman in 2007–08, then sat out his sophomore year to develop. In 2009–10, Abromaitis became a starter and averaged 16.1 points per game. The following season Abromaitis teamed with Ben Hansbrough to lead the Irish to a 27–7 record and a #2 seed in the 2011 NCAA Tournament. Abromaitis averaged 15.4 points and 6.1 rebounds per game on the season. After the season, he was suspended for four games for violating one of the NCAA rules back in 2009 season.

Abromaitis was poised for a strong senior year, but it was cut short after two games as he tore his anterior cruciate ligament on November 25, 2011. Following the season, Notre Dame petitioned the NCAA for a sixth year of eligibility, but the waiver request was denied.

In addition to his on-court play, Abromaitis was known for his success as a student-athlete. He was twice named a first team Academic All-American and was the first player to be named Big East Conference Scholar-athlete of the Year three times. He completed his undergraduate finance degree in three years and was able to complete a Master of Business Administration degree in 2010 at Notre Dame's Mendoza College of Business.

Professional career
After failing to receive a sixth year of college eligibility and going undrafted in the 2012 NBA draft, Abromaitis signed with ASVEL Lyon-Villeurbanne in France's top league. He averaged 9.4 points and 4.4 rebounds per game. For the 2013–14 season he moved to Strasbourg IG, playing in LNB Pro A and Euroleague competition.

For the 2014–15 season, he played with Basketball Löwen Braunschweig in the highest German league.

On July 14, 2015, he signed with Iberostar Tenerife of the Spanish Liga ACB. On April 30, 2017, he won the 2017 Basketball Champions League Final Four.

On July 3, 2018, he re-signed with Iberostar Tenerife of the Spanish Liga ACB.

On July 8, 2019, Abromaitis signed a two-year deal with Russian club Zenit Saint Petersburg. He averaged 7.5 points and 3.7 rebounds per game. On July 15, 2020, he signed a two-year deal with Unicaja of the Liga ACB.

On July 7, 2022, Abromaitis signed three-year contract with Lenovo Tenerife of the Liga ACB.

National team career
In 2011, Abromaitis represented the United States in the 2011 Summer Universiade in China. He averaged 6.4 points and 4.3 rebounds in 8 games as the team finished in fifth place with a 7–1 record.

Personal life
Tim's father, Jim, played collegiately for the University of Connecticut and for several overseas teams, notably Real Madrid and Pallacanestro Varese.

Abromaitis is of Lithuanian descent.

Career statistics

Basketball Champions League
Source:

|-
| style="text-align:left;background:#AFE6BA;" | 2016–17†
| style="text-align:left;" | Tenerife
| 20 || 22.0 || .548 || .455 || .886 || 5.3 || 1.1 || .8 || .4 || 9.1
|-
| style="text-align:left;" | 2017–18
| style="text-align:left;" | Tenerife
| 16 || 21.9 || .562 || .561 || .857 || 4.5 || 1.1 || .8 || .5 || 9.9
|}

References

External links
 	
 Notre Dame Fighting Irish bio
 Tim Abromaitis at euroleague.net
 Tim Abromaitis at lnb.fr

1989 births
Living people
American expatriate basketball people in France
American expatriate basketball people in Germany
American expatriate basketball people in Russia
American expatriate basketball people in Spain
American men's basketball players
American people of Lithuanian descent
ASVEL Basket players
Baloncesto Málaga players
Basketball Löwen Braunschweig players
Basketball players from Connecticut
BC Zenit Saint Petersburg players
CB Canarias players
Liga ACB players
Notre Dame Fighting Irish men's basketball players
People from Farmington, Connecticut
Power forwards (basketball)
SIG Basket players
Sportspeople from Waterbury, Connecticut